Events in the year 2022 in Rwanda.

Incumbents 
 President: Paul Kagame
 Prime minister: Édouard Ngirente

Events 
 13 April - Rwanda asylum plan
 18 June  – Nyamagabe bus shooting

Scheduled 
 20–26 June: 2022 Commonwealth Heads of Government Meeting

Ongoing 
 2022 Democratic Republic of the Congo–Rwanda tensions
 COVID-19 pandemic in Rwanda

References 

 
Rwanda
Rwanda
2020s in Rwanda
Years of the 21st century in Rwanda